Alexandra Bokyun Chun is an American actress and filmmaker. Born in South Korea, she lives in Los Angeles, California.

Early life and education
Alexandra Bokyun Chun immigrated to the United States when she was seven years old. After attending McDonogh School in Maryland, she pursued a study in Western Philosophy at St. John's College, U. S. in Santa Fe, New Mexico.

Intent on becoming a medical doctor after graduation, she entered a relationship with Ottmar Liebert in her senior year which dramatically changed the course of her life to pursue the performing arts.

Career
Shortly after moving to Los Angeles for an acting career in film, she was cast for a regular role on the soap, Another World, which moved her to New York City. When her contract ended with the soap opera, she returned to Los Angeles to work in numerous film and television shows.

In 1999, along with three other theatre professionals, she founded and co-artistic directed a theatre company called Lodestone Theatre Ensemble.  In the Fall of 2004, as writer, director, and producer, Alexandra Chun launched a website of short films that take place in hotel rooms.

Personal life
On July 25, 2016, Alexandra Chun returned to her birthplace, South Korea to protest the torture and slaughter of dogs in the Asian Dog Meat Trade. She returned to the US with three dogs rescued from slaughter.

Partial filmography
Mugunghwaggoti pieotseubnida (1995) - Daughter of Dr. Lee Hui So
Color of a Brisk and Leaping Day (1996) - Angela
Strategic Command (1997) - Amie
Cold Night Into Dawn (1997) - Shen
Where's Marlowe? (1998) - Detective Hsu
Ali (2001) - Cosmetologist
A Ribbon of Dreams (2002) - June Wong
Saw (2004) - Carla
Innocent Blood (2013) - Susan Park
Tiny Pretty Things (2020) -  Maricel Park

References

External links

Alexandrachun.com
The Hotel Movies
Dog Rescue 

Living people
American film actresses
American television actresses
American actresses of Korean descent
South Korean emigrants to the United States
20th-century American actresses
Year of birth missing (living people)
21st-century American women